Fable is a series of action role-playing video games for Xbox, Microsoft Windows, macOS, Xbox 360 and Xbox One platforms. The series was developed by Lionhead Studios until the studio was closed in 2016, and is published by Xbox Game Studios.

Setting
The Fable series takes place in the fictional nation of Albion, a state that, at the time of the first game, is composed of numerous autonomous city-states with vast areas of countryside or wilderness in between. The setting originally resembles Medieval Britain, with some European elements. The name Albion itself is an ancient albeit still used name for Great Britain. The period of time progresses with each game; in Fable II, Albion has advanced to an era similar to that of the Age of Enlightenment, and by Fable III the nation has been unified under a monarchy and is undergoing an "Age of Industry" similar to the real-world 18th-19th-century Industrial Revolution.

In the first Fable, players assume the role of an orphaned boy who is forced into a life of heroism when bandits attack his village, kill his parents and kidnap his sister. The choices players make in the game affect the perception and reaction to their Hero by the characters of Albion and change the Hero's appearance to mirror what good or evil deeds he has performed. In addition to the main quest to learn what happened to the Hero's family, players can engage in optional quests and pursuits such as trading, romance and married life, pub gaming, boxing, exploring, and theft.

Fable II takes place 500 years after the events of the first game. The world resembles Europe between the late 1600s and early 1700s, the time of highwaymen and the Enlightenment. Science and more modern ideas have suppressed the religion and magic of old Albion. Its towns have developed into cities, weaponry is slowly taking advantage of gunpowder, and social, family and economic life present more possibilities - as well as challenges. The sequel basically expands most or all parts of the gaming experience from the previous game, without changing the elementary modes of playing. The continent of Albion is larger as a game world, but contains fewer locations, and the locations that remain are more developed and detailed. In contrast to Fable, the solving of set quests is not the basis of the story; rather, the story develops from the player's situation in time and place. This gives the game a sense of more interactivity than the first title in the series.

In Fable III the setting is 50 years after that of Fable II. The historical development is further advanced since the last version: Albion is experiencing an industrial revolution and society resembles that of the early 1800s. In all of the versions, the moral development (in a negative or a positive way) is at the core of the gameplay. This moral development is expanded to include the personal or psychological and has a more political aspect, as the goal of the game is to overthrow the oppressive king of Albion, as well as defend the continent from attacks from abroad.

Gameplay

As role-playing video games, the Fable series constructs the development of a protagonist controlled by the player, and the development is related to the same character's interaction with the game world. A major part of this interaction is for the Fable series related to interaction with people, be it conversation, storytelling, education, trading, gaming, courting and relationships, or fighting.

The player is able to develop the protagonist following several parameters, such as magic, strength and social skills. The player may also direct the moral quality of the protagonist, so that skills may be developed in equal terms and conditions both in the negative and positive field.

In addition to this basis of the gameplay, some of the versions focus on set quests that together give the protagonist the opportunity to develop, as well as unveiling strands of the story of the game.

Fable II and Fable III include cooperative gameplay, where two players with their own character can join forces in their different tasks.

History

Fable (2001–2006)
The first game, Fable, was teased in 2001 by developer Lionhead Studios. Lead designer and Lionhead co-founder Peter Molyneux "promised an experience like no other" and that the game would "revolutionize the RPG". Fable was released for Xbox on 14 September 2004. It was originally seen very poorly as it was mostly reported that the game had no content due to the substantial amount of unfulfilled "promises" by Molyneux, which he soon apologized for, garnering even more press coverage.

Despite offers from such large companies, such as Electronic Arts, the over-ambition experienced during Fables development and overestimated sales of the original game had left Lionhead Studios with low stocks and in debt. To gain access to a bigger budget Lionhead signed with Microsoft Game Studios. An extended version, Fable: The Lost Chapters, was released for Windows and Xbox in September 2005; Feral Interactive ported the game to the Mac platform on 31 March 2008. It featured new content in many forms and, with the support of Microsoft, was a critical and commercial success.

Fable II, Fable III (2006–2012)
Fable II was released for Xbox 360 on 24 October 2008. It was also a critical and commercial success. It featured a tie-in game called Fable II Pub Games that was released on the Xbox Live Arcade, and an interactive online flash game called Fable: A Hero's Tale that allowed players to open a secret chest in the main game.

A third game, Fable III, was released for Xbox 360 on 29 October 2010, and a Microsoft Windows release on 17 March 2011. This game also featured a tie-in phone game called Fable Coin Golf.

On 2 May 2012, Fable Heroes, was released for the Xbox Live Arcade. Despite the amount of differences the game has from others in the series and its mixed critical reception, it being a multiplayer-based family-friendly beat-em-up, the game is popular among fans as it still embodies some of fans' favorite iconic elements of the series.

Decline (2012–2020)
Fable: The Journey, a spin-off within the series, was released in October 2012 in North America and Europe. The game utilized the Kinect attachment for the Xbox 360. Lead designer Peter Molyneux departed Lionhead Studios in 2012.

Lionhead Studios released an Xbox 360 remake of the original game, including The Lost Chapters, called Fable Anniversary to mixed reviews in February 2014. Fable Trilogy, a compilation for Xbox 360 that includes Fable Anniversary, Fable II and Fable III was released in February 2014.

Fable-themed card games were released as part of the Microsoft Solitaire Collection for the PC on March 4, 2014.

In August 2013, Lionhead Studios released a teaser trailer for Fable Legends, an Xbox One title set during the "Age of Heroes" long before the events of the first game. The trailer emphasizes that in the game the player would play alongside four other players and may choose to be the Hero of the story or the Villain. Microsoft canceled the project in March 2016 and Lionhead Studios was closed soon afterwards.

In May 2016, former Lionhead developers launched a Kickstarter campaign to crowdfund Fable Fortune, a free-to-play collectible card game. The game was previously in development at Lionhead prior to the studio's closure. The game was released for the Xbox One in February 2018.

Reboot (2020–present)
In January 2018, rumors surfaced that a new Fable game was being developed by Playground Games, and that studio was hiring 177 positions for an open world role-playing game. During the Xbox Games Showcase in July 2020, a new Fable was announced as being in development, with the game releasing on the Xbox Series X and Series S and Microsoft Windows at an undisclosed date. It will run on the Forza series' in-house game engine, ForzaTech. In November 2021, Eidos-Montréal would join the project as a co-developer.

References

External links
 Developer website 

 
Microsoft franchises
Video games developed in the United Kingdom
Video game franchises
Video game franchises introduced in 2004
Video games adapted into novels